The 1967 Washington Huskies football team was an American football team that represented the University of Washington during the 1967 NCAA University Division football season.  In its eleventh season under head coach Jim Owens, the team compiled a 5–5 record, tied for fourth place in the Athletic Association of Western Universities (Pac-8), and outscored its opponents 136 to 130.

Washington won only two of its six home games; the notable victory was over the "Giant Killers" of Oregon State in the conference opener. The Huskies had just one loss after five games, but won only one of the last five.

This was the last year for natural grass in Husky Stadium; AstroTurf was installed prior to the 1968 season.

Schedule

Roster

NFL/AFL Draft selections
Five University of Washington Huskies were selected in the 1968 NFL/AFL draft, which lasted seventeen rounds with 462 selections.

References

Washington
Washington Huskies football seasons
Washington Huskies football